Yevgeny Misharin (born February 13, 1990 in Tyumen, USSR) is a Russian futsal player. He plays as a defender of Dina Moscow, and formerly played for the Russian national futsal team.

Biography
Misharin is a graduate of the Tyumen futsal. He debuted in Tyumen in the season 2008/09. For several years Yevgeny mostly played for the Tyumen reserve and "Tobol-Tyumen-2", increasingly being more and more engaged in the first team. Yevgeny began the following season as a player of the Tyumen first team. He spent the 2011/12 season on loan in the team of KPRF. That season he spent only nine games because of severe knee injury in an exhibition game with “Polytech”. He was out until the end of the season. Before the start of the season 2012/13 he was invited to “Dina”, which was headed by the well-known head coach who worked together with Yevgeny in “Tyumen – Beto”.

He was repeatedly engaged in the youth national team. His game attracted the attention of Russian national futsal team coaches. Evgeni spent two games as a part of the first team of the country.

Achievements
 Russian Futsal Championship Winner (1): 2014
 Russian Futsal Super League Vice-Champion (1): 2010

External links
MFK Dina Moskva profile
AMFR profile

1990 births
Living people
MFK Dina Moskva players
Russian men's futsal players
People from Tyumen
Sportspeople from Tyumen Oblast